Karen Swenson (born July 29, 1936 New York City) is an American poet and journalist.

Life
She grew up in Chappaqua, New York, and studied at Barnard College and New York University.

Swenson has been Poet-in-Residence at Skidmore College, the University of Idaho, University of Denver, Clark University, Scripps College and Barnard College.  She taught at City College, New York.

Her work has appeared in The New York Times, The Beloit Poetry Journal, Paris Review, American Poetry Review, "Saturday Review", and "The New Yorker".

Awards
 1993 National Poetry Series, for The Landlady in Bangkok
 Lannan Residency 
 Yaddo Residencies

Works

Stories

Anthologies

Edited

References

External links

"Woodrow Wilson Visiting Fellow Karen Swenson, a Poet, Journalist and World Traveler, at Centenary Nov. 15-19"

1936 births
Living people
American women poets
American women journalists
People from Chappaqua, New York
21st-century American women